The Battle of Takatenjin (高天神の戦い) was fought in 1574 between the forces of Tokugawa Ieyasu and the forces of Takeda Katsuyori.

Katsuyori captured the Tokugawa fortress of Takatenjin, a feat which his father had unsuccessfully attempted. This attack was also displayed in the Akira Kurosawa film Kagemusha.

See also
Siege of Takatenjin (1574)

References

Takatenjin
1574 in Japan
Takatenjin